The 1961–62 Sheffield Shield season was the 60th season of the Sheffield Shield, the domestic first-class cricket competition of Australia. New South Wales won the championship for the ninth consecutive year.

Table

Statistics

Most Runs
Bill Lawry 790

Most Wickets
Wes Hall 43

References

Sheffield Shield
Sheffield Shield
Sheffield Shield seasons